Heorhiy Vadimovich Pohosov  (born July 14, 1960), also known as George Pogosov, is a retired Soviet/Ukrainian sabre fencer. He won two Olympic medals.

Biography
Pohosov has a master's degree in physical education with a focus in fencing. He graduated from the National University of Physical Education and Sport of Ukraine.

His first coach was Mikhail Shimshovich.

Pohosov was the coach of the Ukrainian National Team before coming to the US. In 1999, Pohosov came to Stanford University's fencing program. He is the co-head coach for the Stanford men’s and women’s varsity fencing teams as well as the head coach for the Cardinal Fencing Club, Stanford's recreational fencing outlet. In addition to his Olympic medals, his honors include Junior World Champion and six-time World Champion (1983.1985.1986.1987,1989.1990). In the United States, he teaches all fencing weapons and works with fencers of all levels, instructing classes for children, teenagers, and adults. 
 
A number of Pohosov's students have become finalists and champions of various National tournaments, including Samuel Kwong and Erika Yong.

He was born and lived in Kyiv.

References

External links
 Cardinal Fencing Club

1960 births
Living people
Soviet male sabre fencers
Ukrainian male sabre fencers
Olympic fencers of the Soviet Union
Olympic fencers of the Unified Team
Fencers at the 1988 Summer Olympics
Fencers at the 1992 Summer Olympics
Olympic gold medalists for the Unified Team
Olympic silver medalists for the Soviet Union
Olympic medalists in fencing
Sportspeople from Kyiv
Ukrainian people of Armenian descent
Medalists at the 1988 Summer Olympics
Medalists at the 1992 Summer Olympics